A number of Scottish mountains and hills share the name Beinn Bhuidhe, including:
Beinn Bhuidhe (Glen Fyne), a Munro in the southwestern Highlands
Beinn Bhuidhe (Mull), a Marilyn on the Isle of Mull
Beinn Bhuidhe (Knoydart), a Corbett in Knoydart
Ben Buie, a mountain in the south of the Isle of Mull